Muhamed "Mo" Sacirbey (born 20 July 1956), born as Muhamed Šaćirbegović, is a Bosnian-American lawyer, businessman, and diplomat. He rose to prominence in the 1990s when Bosnia and Herzegovina appointed him to be their ambassador to the United Nations. Sacirbey also served briefly as Minister of Foreign Affairs of the Republic of Bosnia and Herzegovina.

Early life
Muhamed Sacirbey was born Muhamed Šaćirbegović in Sarajevo, Yugoslavia. Both of Sacirbey's parents were doctors. His father Nedžib Šaćirbegović (1926–2021) was a member of the organisation "Young Muslims" (Mladi Muslimani) and a close friend of Alija Izetbegović, the first and only president of the Republic of Bosnia and Herzegovina. Izetbegović and Sacirbey's father were imprisoned for opposing the communist government of SFR Yugoslavia following World War II.

In 1963, the family left SFY Yugoslavia due to his father's and mother's anti-communist politics (both had spent time in prison for their activities) and lived for a while in Turkey and Libya before settling in the United States in 1967. The Šaćirbegović family lived in Parma, Ohio, a suburb of Cleveland, Ohio, and became naturalized citizens in 1973. It was at this point that the family name was changed to Sacirbey. Sacirbey attended Valley Forge High School in Parma Heights, Ohio. "Mo" was elected student council representative even before he became U.S. citizen, became a highly acclaimed football player as well as academically recognized - he was accepted to Harvard among other highly acclaimed universities.

Sacirbey attended Tulane University in New Orleans on a football scholarship and subsequently received a law degree from Tulane Law School and an MBA at Columbia Business School. Sacirbey served as legal counsel to Standard & Poor's. Most of Sacirbey's professional career was spent as an investment banker on Wall Street.

Sacirbey has a younger brother Omar, who is a journalist in Boston. In the 1990s, a street was named after their mother, Aziza, in Sarajevo.

Bosnian War
When the Bosnian War began in April 1992, Sacirbey was asked to assist the fledgling state gain admission to the United Nations. He became Bosnia's first ambassador to the United Nations. He began his term on 22 May 1992, the day that Bosnia and Herzegovina was admitted to the UN. During the war, he made many impassioned pleas for the lifting of the arms embargo against the Bosnian government and made repeated calls for the UN to protect the so-called safe areas from indiscriminate attacks. He traveled the world in a bid for support. Former President Bill Clinton, who in private referred to him as "Ambassador Mo" wrote of Sacirbey in his book "My Life": "Holbrooke and his team landed in the Croatian coastal city of Split, where they briefed the Bosnian foreign minister, Muhamed Sacirbey, on our plans. Sacirbey was the eloquent public face of Bosnia on American television, a handsome, fit man who, as a student in the United States had been a starting football player at Tulane University. He had long sought greater American involvement in his beleaguered nation and was glad the hour had finally come."

In May 1995, the foreign minister of Bosnia and Herzegovina, Irfan Ljubijankić was assassinated. Sacirbey was appointed to replace him for a brief period. Sacirbey also had become Bosnia's Agent before the International Court of Justice leading the country's genocide case against Serbia/Montenegro from outset from 1993 to 2001. Sacirbey was also instrumental in seeing the International Criminal Tribunal for the former Yugoslavia (ICTY) and was informal representative as well as witness many years later from 2003 until 2009.

In November 1995, he accompanied the Bosnian delegation to the peace negotiations in Dayton, Ohio. The settlement came to be known as the Dayton Agreement. During the talks, Sacirbey actually delivered his resignation as foreign minister to protest what he perceived as accommodation of Serbia's strongman Slobodan Milošević and legitimization of ethnic cleansing. Subsequently, Sacirbey alleged that a "yellow light" had been given to Milošević by US and European representatives to overrun the UN and NATO protected "safe areas" of Srebrenica, Žepa and Goražde. He has testified to such effect before the ICTY.

Sacirbey also represented Bosnia to the Rome negotiations on the International Criminal Court (ICC), and after successfully working to incorporate "gender based" crimes and eliminate the death penalty (with an accomplished team of young jurists incorporated into his delegation), was a subsequent signatory on the Rome Treaty. Sacirbey had been an advocate and active in the establishment of the ICC and became Vice-Chair of the Prep Committee on the ICC.

Controversy
After the war, Sacirbey continued to serve as ambassador to the UN until late 2000. Upon leaving this position, rumors of financial irregularities in the Bosnian UN mission began to circulate. In 2001, the Bosnian government began to investigate Sacirbey on suspicion "of abuse of office" for purportedly expending funds for purposes not authorized including Bosnia's "genocide case" against Serbia/Montenegro before the International Court of Justice.

Sacirbey denied allegations of any improper use of funds and said the entire affair was fabricated by political opponents in Bosnia and the United States. He also stated he spent up to $800,000 of his own money to cover Bosnia's diplomatic expenses. Although there was no indictment, formal charges or even formal investigation, on 29 January 2002, the Bosnian government formally asked the US to extradite Sacirbey. Sacirbey had offered to deliver himself should such be requested. However, he was arrested on 25 March 25 2003 at his home in Staten Island. Sacirbey spent the next sixteen months at the Metropolitan Correctional Center in New York. He was released on 27 July 2004 with a six-million-dollar bail, and the recommendation of the Bosnian Chairman of the Council of Ministers (i.e. the Prime Minister) who referred to Sacirbey as "an honorable person", whether or not allegations of abuse of office may have been accurate.

Sacirbey from the outset contended that the U.S. Government was dictating the extradition request upon obedient Bosnian authorities, including misrepresenting the status of any "investigation" in Bosnia or alleged abuse of office. On 19 January 2005, he was certified by a federal magistrate in New York as extraditable. Sacirbey appealed his certification by filing a habeas corpus petition on 21 March 2005 before a federal district judge. In September 2006, the district judge denied his petition for habeas corpus relief and ruled that he was extraditable. Sacirbey appealed the decision to the United States Court of Appeals for the Second Circuit.

On 9 December 2009, the appeals court ruled that Sacirbey could not be extradited. Further, the Court cited Sacirbey's exemplary service and questionable political circumstances of the case. Finally, the Court concluded that the US Government had no obligation to extradite Sacirbey, should not have pursued the matter in the first place and on the basis of evidence/case presented not to repeat the mistake.

Works
A Convenient Genocide in a Fishbowl, by Mohammed Sacerbey

Further reading
Sacirbey Out on Bail
US Court Rules Former Bosnian Foreign Minister Eligible for Extradition
Legal document from the US District Court
 Sacirbey testimony to the International War Crimes Tribunal for the Former Yugoslavia 15 June 2009.
 Sacirbey testimony to the International War Crimes Tribunal for the Former Yugoslavia 16 June 2009.
 Sacirbey testimony to the International War Crimes Tribunal for the Former Yugoslavia 17 June 2009.
 Sacirbey testimony to the International War Crimes Tribunal for the Former Yugoslavia 18 June 2009.
Sacirbey testimony to the International War Crimes Tribunal for the Former Yugoslavia 19 June 2009.

References

External links

1956 births
Living people
Bosniaks of Bosnia and Herzegovina
Bosnia and Herzegovina Muslims
American people of Bosniak descent
Politicians of the Bosnian War
Diplomats from Sarajevo
People from Staten Island
Tulane University alumni
Yugoslav emigrants to the United States
Columbia Business School alumni
Permanent Representatives of Bosnia and Herzegovina to the United Nations
Foreign ministers of Bosnia and Herzegovina
People from Parma, Ohio
American Muslims